Little Demon is an adult animated sitcom created by Darcy Fowler, Seth Kirschner and Kieran Valla that premiered on FXX on August 25, 2022. The series features the voices of Aubrey Plaza, Danny DeVito, and Lucy DeVito. The series is the first show produced by Atomic Cartoons aimed at an adult audience.

Synopsis 
13 years after being impregnated by Satan, Laura and her Antichrist daughter, Chrissy, attempt to live an ordinary life in Delaware, but are constantly overwhelmed by monstrous forces, including Satan, who wants custody of Chrissy's soul.

Cast

Main 
 Aubrey Plaza as Laura Feinberg
 Danny DeVito as Satan
 Lucy DeVito as Chrissy Feinberg

Recurring 
 Eugene Cordero as Bennigan Aquino
 Lennon Parham as Darlene
 Michael Shannon as Unshaven Man
 Seth Kirschner as Erwin
 Ali Ahn as Arabella
 Charlie McWade as Snake with Arms

Guest Stars 
Sam Richardson as Asmodeus ("Possession Obsession")
Arnold Schwarzenegger as Game Show Host ("Everybody's Dying for the Weekend")
William Jackson Harper as Jimmy ("Everybody's Dying for the Weekend")
Shangela as Queen Inichoochiama ("Everybody's Dying for the Weekend")
Patrick Wilson as Everett ("Everybody's Dying for the Weekend")
Dave Bautista as Baka ("Night of the Leeches")
June Diane Raphael as Amanda ("Night of the Leeches")
Mark Ruffalo as Bark Woofalo ("The Antichrist's Monster")
Anthony Atamanuik as Gus ("Satan's Lot")
Lamorne Morris as Michael ("Satan's Lot")
Pamela Adlon as Sea Hag ("Wet Bodies")
Rhea Perlman as Durlawn ("Wet Bodies")
Mel Brooks as Millipede ("Village of the Found")
Toks Olagundoye as Vanessa ("Village of the Found")
Richard Kind as himself ("Village of the Found")
Lea Salonga as Amalia / Dia ("The Antichrist's Monster", "Village of the Found")

Episodes

Release
The series premiered on August 25, 2022, on FXX in the United States and Canada.

The series premiered in European countries, Australia, and New Zealand on September 21, 2022, on Disney+ (via Star) and in Latin America on February 8, 2023, on Star+.

Reception 
The review aggregator website Rotten Tomatoes reported a 81% approval rating based on 16 critic reviews. The website's critics consensus reads, "Little Demon heaps on the gore but maintains a disarming sweetness, making for an agreeably zany satanic sit-down." Metacritic, which uses a weighted average, assigned a score of 62 out of 100 based on 8 critics, indicating "generally favorable reviews".

References

Notes

External links 
 

2020s American adult animated television series
2020s American black comedy television series
2020s American sitcoms
2022 American television series debuts
2020s Canadian adult animated television series
2020s Canadian sitcoms
2022 Canadian television series debuts
American adult animated comedy television series
American adult animated horror television series
American animated sitcoms
American flash adult animated television series
Animated television series about dysfunctional families
Animation controversies in television
Canadian adult animated comedy television series
Canadian animated sitcoms
Canadian flash animated television series
Canadian horror fiction television series
English-language television shows
Disney controversies
FXX original programming
Religious controversies in animation
Religious controversies in television
Religious controversies in the United States
Teen animated television series
Television controversies in the United States
Television series by Fox Television Animation
Fictional depictions of the Antichrist
Demons in television
Television series about demons